Bertrand Vecten (born 26 February 1972 in Compiègne) is a French rower.

References 
 
 

1972 births
Living people
French male rowers
People from Compiègne
Rowers at the 1996 Summer Olympics
Olympic silver medalists for France
Olympic rowers of France
Olympic medalists in rowing
World Rowing Championships medalists for France
Medalists at the 1996 Summer Olympics
Sportspeople from Oise
20th-century French people